Philippe Brun (born 16 October 1991) is a French politician from the Socialist Party who has represented Eure's 4th constituency in the National Assembly since 2022.

See also 

 List of deputies of the 16th National Assembly of France

References 

1991 births
Living people
Socialist Party (France) politicians
21st-century French politicians
Members of Parliament for Eure
Deputies of the 16th National Assembly of the French Fifth Republic

People from Rouen